Mahmoud Wagdy (born 23 March 1948) is an Egyptian politician and a former minister of interior.

Early life and education
Wagdy was born in 1948. He graduated from the Police Academy 1968.

Career
Wagdy was the head of Cairo criminal investigations department and the head of prisons. He was appointed interior minister by President Hosni Mubarak on 31 January 2011, replacing Habib al-Adly. Wagdy's tenure lasted brief and was replaced by Mansour el-Essawy who was appointed by Prime Minister Essam Sharaf on 5 March 2011.

References

 

1948 births
Living people
People from Beheira Governorate
Interior Ministers of Egypt
People of the Egyptian revolution of 2011